The 1986 NCAA Division I Men's Golf Championships were contested at the 48th annual NCAA-sanctioned golf tournament for determining the individual and team national champions of men's collegiate golf at the Division I level in the United States.

The tournament was held at the Bermuda Run Country Club in Winston-Salem, North Carolina, hosted by Wake Forest University.

Home team Wake Forest won the team championship, the Demon Deacons' third NCAA title and first since 1975.

Future professional Scott Verplank, from Oklahoma State, won the individual title.

Individual results

Individual champion
 Scott Verplank, Oklahoma State (282)

Team results

Finalists

Missed cut

DC = Defending champions
Debut appearance

References

NCAA Men's Golf Championship
Golf in North Carolina
NCAA Golf Championship
NCAA Golf Championship
NCAA Golf Championship